National Route 490 is a national highway of Japan connecting between Ube, Yamaguchi and Hagi, Yamaguchi in Japan, with total length has 62.4 km (38.8 mi).

References

490
Roads in Yamaguchi Prefecture